The Clwyd-Powys Archaeological Trust (CPAT) ( (YACP)) is an educational charity which was established in 1975. Its objective is ‘to advance the education of the public in archaeology’. CPAT is one of four Welsh Archaeological Trusts (WATs) which work to help protect, record and interpret all aspects of the historic environment. This includes providing advice to local authorities on archaeology and planning, undertaking archaeological projects for private- and public-sector clients, and delivering a programme of community archaeology events and activities.

History
CPAT was established in 1975 along with three other Welsh Archaeological Trusts. It emerged from the ‘Rescue Archaeology Group’ (RAG) which was set up in 1970 by Chris Musson, who became the first Chief Executive of CPAT. The Trust undertook pioneering work on prehistoric sites in mid-Wales, beginning with the excavation of the Breidden hillfort (Powys) which was being destroyed by quarrying. This was followed by the excavation of a late Iron Age hillslope enclosure at Collfryn (Powys), which found evidence for intensive occupation and remodelling of the site, including round-houses and ‘four-poster’ structures that were probably granaries. CPAT has also undertaken extensive excavations of medieval sites such as Offa's Dyke and Hen Domen, near Montgomery.

CPAT and the other Welsh Archaeological Trusts were pioneers in developing Historic Environment Records (HERs). In the 1970s Wales was the first part of the UK to develop a fully national system of what were then called ‘Sites and Monuments Records’; this fully computerised system was pioneered by Don Benson who was then Chief Executive of the Dyfed Archaeological Trust. During the 1980s there had been good support from government for archaeology, including from Cadw which had been established in 1984. However, with the decline of the Manpower Services Commission funding models began to shift to a more ‘development driven’ model during this period. With the rise of planning-related archaeology in the 1990s CPAT evolved to develop commercial ‘contract’ archaeology services, whilst at the same time maintaining the HER, planning services and other public-facing project work.

In recent years the main focus of CPAT's fieldwork has moved away from large-scale thematic studies of Welsh monuments and landscapes, to more site-specific work undertaken as part of development-led projects. This has led to a wider portfolio of projects across Wales, and in adjacent areas of England. CPAT has also diversified funding and partnerships for public archaeology projects, including long-running and successful partnerships with the National Trust and the Clwydian Range and Dee Valley AONB.

Operation and organisation
Along with the other Welsh Archaeological Trusts CPAT forms part of a ‘tripod’ of institutions which help understand, conserve and interpret archaeology and cultural heritage in Wales. The Trust system in Wales is characterised by depth of regional knowledge and expertise, which partly comes from having many different roles in one organisation.

The Clwyd-Powys Archaeological Trust is organised into three principal departments.

 The Historic Environment Advisory Service does work that in other parts of the UK are delivered by local authorities or by state heritage bodies. The three key areas of operation are: maintaining the regional Historic Environment Record (HER); providing planning advice for local authorities, developers and other bodies; and undertaking heritage management work for Welsh Government, local authorities, landowners, and others.
 The Education and Outreach team run a series of events and activities for the general public, providing education about the archaeological history of the region, and also giving an insight into the work of archaeologists. Some of this work is targeted at areas of social and economic exclusion, including recent work in north-east Wales.
 The Field Services team are responsible for the delivery of archaeological projects funded by private- and public-sector bodies. These include historic environment characterisation, site assessment surveys, field evaluation and excavation, and threat-related excavation and survey.

CPAT is a Registered Organisation with the Chartered Institute for Archaeologists.

CPAT is both a limited company (1212455) and a registered charity (508301). It therefore provides publicly-accessible accounts to Companies House and to the Charity Commission in the UK.
The governing body is the Board of Trustees, who are voluntary non-executive directors. The Trustees delegate their authority for the day-to-day running of the Trust to the Director (Chief Executive). The current Director was appointed in 2013.

Notable people
 Philip Barker, Chair of the Trust 1984-1991
 Paul Belford, Director of the Trust since 2013
 Bill Britnell, Director of the Trust 1986-2013
 Frances Lynch, Chair of the Trust 1991-2017
 Christopher R. Musson, Director of the Trust 1974-1986, and Trustee 2005-2021
 Sian Rees, Chair of the Trust since 2017

Beacon Ring
Since 2008 the Trust has owned Beacon Ring, a hillfort on the Long Mountain near Welshpool. The site was purchased to help safeguard the earthworks for the future. In recent years CPAT has undertaken some archaeological excavations on the site. Fieldwork in 2018 and 2019 investigated the ramparts and entrances.

In 2020 a mound at the centre of the site was investigated. Some accounts had suggested that this was a prehistoric burial mound. However excavation found that this was probably the location of the eponymous beacon, almost certainly of post-medieval date. The mound had later been re-used by the Ordnance Survey as a trig point, both in the 19th century Principal Triangulation of Great Britain and subsequently, with the most recent trig point being installed in 1948.

Notable projects
Breidden hillfort excavations
Collfryn enclosure excavations
Walton Basin (Hindwell) excavations
Roman and later Deeside
Offa's Dyke and Wat's Dyke
Four Crosses bypass
Upland landscapes
Roman roads
North-east Wales Community Archaeology

See also
Dyfed Archaeological Trust
Glamorgan-Gwent Archaeological Trust
Gwynedd Archaeological Trust
Cadw
Royal Commission on the Ancient and Historical Monuments of Wales
Welsh Archaeological Trusts

References

External links
 Clwyd-Powys Archaeological Trust website
CPAT Historic Environment Record
Current Archaeology article about the Welsh Archaeological Trusts
'Archaeology in Trust' booklet celebrating 40 years of the Welsh Archaeological Trusts
Archwilio website

Archaeology of Wales
Archaeological organizations
Historical organisations based in Wales
1970s establishments in Wales
Archaeology of the United Kingdom